Leith Walk is one of the longest streets in Edinburgh, Scotland, and is the main road connecting the centre of the city to Leith. Forming most of the A900 road, it slopes downwards from Picardy Place at the south-western end of the street to the 'Foot of the Walk' at the north-eastern end, where Great Junction Street, Duke Street, Constitution Street and the Kirkgate meet.

Although the whole street is usually referred to as Leith Walk, its upper half is actually divided into several stretches with different names. Unusually, some parts also have different names on opposite sides of the street. Running from its upper (south west) end, on the west side of the street the sections are Picardy Place, Union Place, Antigua Street, Gayfield Place and Haddington Place; on the east side, sections are titled Greenside Place, Baxter's Place, Elm Row and Brunswick Place. It continues (on both sides) as Croall Place, Albert Place, Crighton Place and, after the junction with Pilrig Street, as Leith Walk.

History

There was a rough pathway in the vicinity of modern-day Leith Walk in the time of James II in the mid 15th century.

According to Robert Chambers, Leith Walk, as we know it, owes its existence to a defensive rampart which was constructed between Calton Hill and Leith in 1650. Chambers says the attack on Edinburgh by Cromwell's army in that year was halted at this line by the Scots under Sir David Leslie (whose army was subsequently defeated at the Battle of Dunbar).

From 1702 until 1711 a Robert Miller employed four coaches to travel between Edinburgh and Leith but his route may have employed Easter Road. From 1722 until 1743 the first reasonably priced coach began and this was certainly on Leith Walk. This carried six passengers and had a fare of 3d in summer and 4d in winter. Respective prices rose to 4d and 6d in 1727. In 1748 it was made clearer that whilst coaches could use it, a horse and rider could not. This may refer only to the high road on the rampart section.

The rampart developed later into a footpath described by Daniel Defoe, writing in 1725 and recalling his time in Edinburgh in 1706, as "a very handsome Gravel-walk, 20 Feet broad, continued to the Town of Leith, which is kept in good repair at the public Charge, and no Horse suffered to come upon it."

The majority of traffic was pedestrian which is why the street became known as "the Walk", the name by which it is still known locally. At the time of its creation it provided an alternative (and shorter) route to Edinburgh compared with the older Easter Road and its counterpart Wester Road (present-day Bonnington and Broughton roads) although it did not supersede these routes as the main road to Leith until after the building of the North Bridge, traversable from 1769 and completed in 1772. From 1769 both carriages and horses with riders were permitted on Leith Walk.

To deflect possible opposition to the building of the bridge if it was admitted to be for access to the New Town, the development of which was still controversial, the foundation stone of the bridge, laid by Lord Provost George Drummond, bore the inscription that it was part of "a new road to Leith". As early as 1763 (when work began on building the North Bridge) the Walk had become a coach route with a regular service running from Leith to Edinburgh, departing on the hour, from 8am to 8pm, and run by the Balfours of Pilrig House. The journey took an hour each way, with a rest at the Halfway House at Shrubhill (which existed as a pub until it closed in 1981). At this time it is stated that there were no other coaches in Scotland except the infrequent service from Edinburgh to London.

In 1779, Hugo Arnot, an Edinburgh historian who was born in Leith, stated that 156 coaches travelled the route daily, each carrying 4 passengers at a cost of 2.5d or 3d per person. The road apparently fell into disrepair because of its frequent use by coaches and was not repaired until 1810 when it was relaid as a "splendid causeway" raising the road level by around 6 feet. This was "at great expense by the City of Edinburgh and had a toll erected for its payment".

In 1985 the whole of Leith Walk underwent a major relandscaping, with an avenue of trees down the road centre (jumping to the pavements in the lower half). Sadly this was all destroyed by the tram project (see below), and only a few remnant trees on the side streets (Brunswick Street and Balfour Street) survive to show what was lost.

Buildings

Before the sudden surge of tenement construction in the 1870s the street was largely rural in character with several nurseries along its length. The separate mansion houses which had been built in the early 19th century were more numerous on the west side than the east. When the tenements were built, it was easier (cheaper) to buy up the few mansions on the east side, which is why the two sides still have different characters to some extent. A large number of tenements were built in a very short time period, between Smiths Place and Brunswick Street, stretching eastwards to Easter Road along Albert, Dalmeny, and other streets. These are all by John Chesser (architect).

The McDonald Road Library is arguably the most architecturally distinguished building on the Walk. Originally a Nelson Hall, funded by its benefactor, the publisher and printer Thomas Nelson, it is now a public library run by the City of Edinburgh Council. It was built in 1902 in a Baronial Renaissance style to designs by H Ramsay Taylor.

Several notable buildings have disappeared in the past half century. The Alhambra Cinema, which stood at the end of Springfield Street, was replaced by a Tyre and Exhaust Centre (now a wine warehouse). This Egyptian style building was originally a theatre. Now it is remembered only in the name of a pub on the opposite side of the street. The Halfway House was a coaching inn at Shrubhill, dating from the 17th century. It survived in truncated form as a pub. At the time of its demolition in 1983 the central horseshoe bar was salvaged and reused in the Shrub Bar/Horseshoe Bar to the north.

The Gardener's Cottage at Haddington Place, dating from 1765, originally served the first Edinburgh Botanic Garden to its rear. It was demolished in 2009 and has been re-assembled in the current Botanic Garden in Inverleith.

The main station building of Leith Central Station still stands at the Foot of the Walk. Although the huge columnless railway shed was demolished in the late 1980s, the building which housed the station bars and waiting rooms survives, including the Central Bar which is decorated from floor to ceiling with over 250,000 Staffordshire Potteries tiles with four tiled murals depicting sporting pursuits such as golf, mainly by Minton, Hollins & Co.

The Bier Hoose bar, formerly known as The Boundary Bar and City Limits bar, stands on the old boundary line between Leith and Edinburgh. Prior to 1920, when Leith and Edinburgh merged, it was necessary to use both entrance doors because Leith and Edinburgh magistrates set different licensing rules. The main effect of this was that the bar on the Leith side served until 9.30pm and after that the customers could adjourn to the Edinburgh side to enjoy additional drinking time.

Pilrig Church (now Pilrig St Paul's Church) is visible along the entire length of Leith Walk. It was designed by architects Peddie and Kinnear and constructed (1861–63) originally for the Free Church of Scotland. It has a fine interior, including early examples of stained glass by Daniel Cottier and a historic organ by Forster and Andrews (1903). The hall to the rear blends in perfectly but is a later addition from 1892

On the upper Elm Row section, midway between Brunswick Street and Montgomery Street, are the remains of what was built as William Williams' New Veterinary College. Only the front building remains, as the complex of stables and support buildings were demolished to create student housing in 2014. The front building was designed in 1872 by William Hamilton Beattie with sculpture by John Rhind. The sculpture was removed and ornate ground floor lost in the 1970s when converted into studio space for Scottish Television's Gateway Studios. The main college structure stood to the rear and contained a fascinating combination ranging from stained glass to stables. The huge rear college complex was demolished in 2014 to make room for student housing.

Other recent losses include the "Craig and Rose" paint and varnish works at Steads Place and Springfield Street, famous suppliers of the red paint used on the Forth Bridge (which was used as their company logo). This site has been redeveloped as housing. Leith Walk terminates (in colloquial terms at least) at the Omni Centre and St. James Centre at its southern end. The lower northern end terminates where Great Junction and Duke streets meet.

Trams

Leith Walk was one of the first and last places in Edinburgh and Leith to see trams. Leith had Scotland's first electric tram in 1905. On Leith Walk this terminated at Pilrig Church and passengers had to change to Edinburgh's cable-drawn cars. This messy changeover was known as the "Pilrig muddle". Edinburgh did not electrify its system and smooth out this problem until 1925. Edinburgh's "last tram" of the earlier tram era ran in 1956 and terminated at the Shrub Hill tram depot on Leith Walk. At that time trams were discontinued because of their "inflexibility" and the advantages of a bus-based system.

Leith Walk was intended to be part of the new Edinburgh Trams route, scheduled to open in 2011. However, this section of the line was scrapped in June 2011 after major delays and cost overruns.
 In 2019, the Leith extension to the tram line was re-approved, and trams are now expected to run on Leith Walk by 2023.

Shrubhill
Shrubhill is a distinct area of Leith Walk just south of Pilrig. It was once the site of a gibbet known as the Gallow Lee, literally the "field with the gallows", where several infamous executions took place. Major Thomas Weir, who had admitted to several sex crimes and was further accused of being a witch, was strangled and burned at Gallow Lee in 1670. Bodies were buried at the base of the gallows or their ashes scattered if burnt. The pile of sand and bones at the foot of the gallows was sold to builders of the New Town around 1760 and sold to purchase "shrub" a mix of rum and lemon, which is allegedly where the name Shrubhill begins.

Shrubhill House (a 17th-century mansion) was home to Jane Gordon, Duchess of Gordon and her parents Lord and Lady Maxwell. It was demolished around 1960 and replaced by an ugly concrete namesake Shrubhill House, which in turn was demolished in 2015.

From 1905 to 1956 Shrubhill housed a major tram depot, some buildings of which still survive on Dryden Street. The site was redeveloped from 2019 to 2021 and is now mainly residential, with a high ratio of student accommodation.

People executed at the Gallow Lee include: Major Weir (1670), five male witches (1681), Norman Ross, murderer of Lady Baillie (1752) left to hang as bones in the gibbet for many years.

Residents
Grace Cadell (1855-1918), Scotland's first female surgeon. Ran a suffragette refuge at 145 Leith Walk.
George Coull (1862-1936), Scottish pharmaceutical chemist; lived in the main villa on Smiths Place
John Crabbie, founder of Crabbie's whisky and Crabbie's Green Ginger, lived at 4 Smiths Place
Mary Fee, Scottish Labour politician
F. A. Fitzbayne (1878-1935), creator of Leith's electric tram (1906) lived at 5 Smiths Place
Alexander Henderson of Press (d.1826) Lord Provost of Edinburgh 1823 to 1825 lived at the mansion at the Old Physic Garden (built over by Haddington Place)
William Allan of Glen (1788-1868) Lord Provost of Edinburgh 1829 to 1831 lived at Hillside House, demolished to build Elm Row
McCulloch of Ardwell lived in Springfield House (which gives its name to Springfield Street) and was often visited by Samuel Foote
Andrew Macdonald (poet) (1757-1790)
John Smart RSA lived at 13 Annandale Street

Changes

Curiously Iona Street was originally called Falshaw Street after Lord Provost James Falshaw and Dalmeny Street was Colston Street. Both names only lasted from 1880 to 1890.

Appearance in Film
The 1948 documentary film "Waverley Steps" contains footage of trams on Leith Walk at the Pilrig junction.

See also
Leith Walk (Edinburgh ward)

References

External links
Cassell's Old and New Edinburgh: Its History, its people and its places, oldandnewedinburgh.co.uk; accessed 2 September 2017.
Bartholomew's Chronological map of Edinburgh (1919), nls.uk; accessed 2 September 2017.
The burial of the heads of the Covenanters hanged at the Gallow Lee, geograph.org.uk; accessed 2 September 2017.
Descriptions of Leith Walk in the 19th century, geograph.org.uk; accessed 2 September 2017.
Leith Walk news – award-winning local charity set up to champion better public spaces in the area, greenerleith.org; accessed 2 September 2017.

Streets in Edinburgh
Leith